Zangdopelri Monastery also known as Zangdokpalri monastery is a Buddhist monastery in Bhutan. It was built for seven years and was completed in 2009 by the support of  Queen Kesang Choden of Bhutan.

Name
The name zangdokpalri means copper mountain and is the heavenly abode of guru rinpoche in Tibetan legends.

References

External links
 Official site
 Zangdopelri Lhakhang at Kurjey consecrated

Buddhist monasteries in Bhutan
Tibetan Buddhist monasteries
Tibetan Buddhism in Bhutan
2009 establishments in Bhutan